Anpere: Anthropological Perspectives on Religion, is an open access journal founded in 2006 by Swedish anthropologists Pierre Wiktorin and André Möller. The journal's focus is anthropology of religion.

External links
 www.anpere.net

Open access journals
Anthropology journals
Religious studies journals
Anthropology of religion